Wiesław Czaja (born 12 April 1952) is a Polish former volleyball player and coach, a member of the Poland national team from 1974 to 1980, and the 1974 World Champion. He competed in the 1980 Summer Olympics held in Moscow, finishing in 4th place with his national team.

Honours

As a coach
 Youth national team
 2013  European Youth Olympic Festival

External links

 
 
 Coach/Player profile at Volleybox.net

1952 births
Living people
People from Czechowice-Dziedzice
Polish men's volleyball players
Polish volleyball coaches
Olympic volleyball players of Poland
Volleyball players at the 1980 Summer Olympics
AZS Częstochowa players
Skra Bełchatów coaches